The 2018 United States House of Representatives elections in Georgia were held on November 6, 2018, to elect the fourteen U.S. representatives from the state of Georgia, one from each of the state's fourteen congressional districts. The elections coincided with a gubernatorial election, as well as other elections to the House of Representatives, elections to the United States Senate, and various state and local elections. The primary elections took place on May 22, 2018.

One seat flipped to the Democrats, changing the state congressional delegation from a 10–4 Republican majority to a 9–5 Republican majority.

Results summary

Statewide

District
Results of the 2018 United States House of Representatives elections in Georgia by district:

District 1

The incumbent was Republican Buddy Carter, who has represented the district since 2015. Carter was re-elected unopposed in 2016.  Carter ran for re-election.

Republican primary

Candidates

Nominee
Earl L. "Buddy" Carter, incumbent U.S. Representative

Primary results

Democratic primary

Candidates

Nominee
Lisa Ring, community organizer

Eliminated in primary
Barbara Seidman, retired businesswoman

Primary results

General election

Endorsements

Results

District 2

The incumbent was Democrat Sanford Bishop, who has represented the district since 1993. Bishop was re-elected with 61% of the vote in 2016.

Democratic primary

Candidates

Nominee
Sanford Bishop, incumbent U.S. Representative

Primary results

Republican primary

Candidates

Nominee
Herman West, pastor

Primary results

General election

Endorsements

Results

District 3

The incumbent was Republican Drew Ferguson, who has represented the district since 2017.  Ferguson was elected with 68% of the vote in 2016.

Republican primary

Candidates

Nominee
Drew Ferguson, incumbent U.S. Representative

Eliminated in primary
Philip Singleton, dentist

Primary results

Democratic primary

Candidates

Nominee
Chuck Enderlin, pilot

Eliminated in primary
Rusty Oliver, science teacher

Primary results

General election

Endorsements

Polling

Results

District 4

The incumbent was Democratic Hank Johnson, who has represented the district since 2007.  Johnson was re-elected with 76% of the vote in 2016.

Democratic primary

Candidates

Nominee
Hank Johnson, incumbent U.S. Representative

Eliminated in primary
Juan Parks, Marine Corps JROTC instructor

Primary results

Republican primary

Candidates

Nominee
Joe Profit, businessman and former NFL player

Primary results

General election

Endorsements

Results

District 5

The incumbent was Democratic John Lewis, who had represented the district from 1987 until his death in 2020. Lewis was re-elected with 84% of the vote in 2016. With no primary challenger and no Republican opposition, Rep. Lewis won his 2018 midterm election for the 116th Congress of the United States by default.

Democratic primary

Candidates

Nominee
John Lewis, incumbent U.S. Representative

Primary results

General election

Endorsements

Results

District 6

The incumbent was Republican Karen Handel, who won a hotly contested special election for the seat in 2017 with almost 52% of the vote. 
This was one of 80 Republican-held House districts targeted by the Democratic Congressional Campaign Committee in 2018.

Republican primary

Candidates

Nominee
Karen Handel, incumbent U.S. Representative

Primary results

Democratic primary

Candidates

Nominee
Lucy McBath, Everytown for Gun Safety and Moms Demand Action national spokesperson

Eliminated in primary
Kevin Abel, businessman
Steven Knight Griffin, management consultant
Bobby Kaple, TV news anchor

Declined
Jon Ossoff, investigative journalist, media executive and nominee for Georgia's 6th congressional district in 2017

Primary results

Runoff results

General election

Endorsements

Polling

Debates
Complete video of debate, October 23, 2018

Predictions

Results

District 7

The incumbent was Republican Rob Woodall, who has represented the district since 2011.  Woodall was re-elected with 60% of the vote in 2016.
This was one of 80 Republican-held House districts targeted by the Democratic Congressional Campaign Committee in 2018.

Republican primary

Candidates

Nominee
Rob Woodall, incumbent U.S. Representative

Eliminated in primary
Shane Hazel, business developer

Primary results

Democratic primary

Candidates

Nominee
Carolyn Bourdeaux, professor

Eliminated in primary
Kathleen Allen, risk management consultant
Mellisa Davis, financial manager
David J. Kim, publisher
Ethan Pham, small business owner
Steve Reilly, attorney

Endorsements

Primary results

Runoff results

General election

Endorsements

Polling

Predictions

Results

After a recount, the 433 vote margin made this the closest race of the 2018 House elections. It was the closest that a Democrat has come to winning this district since its creation in 1993 (it was numbered as the 4th District from 1993 to 1997, the 11th from 1997 to 2003, and has been the 7th since 2003).

District 8

The incumbent was Republican Austin Scott, who has represented the district since 2011.  Scott was re-elected with 68% of the vote in 2016. With no primary challenger and no Democratic opposition, Rep. Scott won his 2018 midterm election for the 116th Congress of the United States barring any further opposition by default.

Republican primary

Candidates

Nominee
Austin Scott, incumbent U.S. Representative

Primary results

General election

Results

District 9

The incumbent was Republican Doug Collins, who has represented northeastern Georgia since 2013. Collins was re-elected unopposed in 2016.

Republican primary
Doug Collins, incumbent U.S. Representative

Primary results

Democratic primary

Candidates

Nominee
Josh McCall, teacher

Eliminated in primary
Dave Cooper

Primary results

General election

Endorsements

Results

District 10

The incumbent was Republican Jody Hice, who has represented the district since 2015.  Hice was re-elected unopposed in 2016.

Republican primary

Candidates

Nominee
Jody Hice, incumbent U.S. Representative

Eliminated in primary
Bradley Griffin, businessman
Joe Hunt, businessman

Primary results

Democratic primary

Candidates

Nominee
Tabitha A. Johnson-Green, registered nurse

Eliminated in primary
Chalis Montgomery, teacher
Richard Dien Winfield, professor

Primary results

General election

Results

District 11

The incumbent was Republican Barry Loudermilk, who has represented the district since 2015.  Loudermilk was re-elected with 67% of the vote in 2016.

Republican primary

Candidates

Nominee
Barry Loudermilk, incumbent U.S. Representative

Primary results

Democratic primary

Candidates

Nominee
Flynn Broady, attorney

Withdrawn
Harry Braun, renewable energy consultant and nominee for Arizona's 1st congressional district in 1984 & 1986

Primary results

General election

Endorsements

Results

District 12

The incumbent was Republican Rick Allen, who has represented the district since 2015.  Allen was re-elected with 62% of the vote in 2016.

Republican primary

Candidates

Nominee
Rick W. Allen, incumbent U.S. Representative

Eliminated in primary
Eugene Yu, businessman and candidate for this seat in 2014 & 2016

Primary results

Democratic primary

Candidates

Nominee
Francys Johnson, lawyer and pastor

Eliminated in primary
Robert Ingham, tax preparer
Trent Nesmith, businessman

Primary results

General election

Endorsements

Results

District 13

The incumbent was Democrat David Scott, who has represented the district since 2003.  Scott was re-elected unopposed in 2016.

Democratic primary
David Scott, incumbent U.S. Representative

Primary results

Republican primary

Candidates

Nominee
David Callahan, part-time driver

Eliminated in primary
Femi Akinkugbe, TSA security

Primary results

General election

Endorsements

Results

District 14

The incumbent was Republican Tom Graves, who has represented northwestern Georgia since 2010. Graves was re-elected unopposed in 2016.

Republican Primary

Candidates

Nominee
Tom Graves, incumbent U.S. Representative

Primary results

Democratic Primary

Candidates

Nominee
Steven Lamar Foster, surgeon

Primary results

General election

Results

  Convicted for DUI in August 2018, Foster ran the race while still behind bars until election day.

References

External links
  (constantly updated)
Candidates at Vote Smart 
Candidates at Ballotpedia 
Campaign finance at FEC 
Campaign finance at OpenSecrets

Official campaign websites of first district candidates
Buddy Carter (R) for Congress
Lisa Ring (D) for Congress

Official campaign websites of second district candidates
Sanford Bishop (D) for Congress
Herman West, Jr. (R) for Congress

Official campaign websites of third district candidates
Chuck Enderlin (D) for Congress
Drew Ferguson (R) for Congress

Official campaign websites of fourth district candidates
Hank Johnson (D) for Congress
Joe Profit (R) for Congress

Official campaign websites of fifth district candidates
John Lewis (D) for Congress

Official campaign websites of sixth district candidates
Karen Handel (R) for Congress
Lucy McBath (D) for Congress

Official campaign websites of seventh district candidates
Carolyn Bourdeaux (D) for Congress
Rob Woodall (R) for Congress

Official campaign websites of eighth district candidates
Austin Scott (R) for Congress

Official campaign websites of ninth district candidates
Doug Collins (R) for Congress
Josh McCall (D) for Congress

Official campaign websites of tenth district candidates
Jody Hice (R) for Congress
Tabitha Johnson-Green (D) for Congress

Official campaign websites of eleventh district candidates
Barry Loudermilk (R) for Congress
Flynn D. Broady Jr. (D) for Congress

Official campaign websites of twelfth district candidates
Rick W. Allen (R) for Congress
Francys Johnson (D) for Congress

Official campaign websites of thirteenth district candidates
David Callahan (R) for Congress
David Scott (D) for Congress

Official campaign websites of fourteenth district candidates
Steve Foster (D) for Congress
Tom Graves (R) for Congress

Georgia
2018
2018 Georgia (U.S. state) elections